In atomic physics, a term symbol is an abbreviated description of the total spin and orbital angular momentum quantum numbers in a multi-electron atom. For a given electron configuration of an atom, its state depends also on its total angular momentum, including spin and orbital components, which are specified by the term. The usual atomic term symbols assume LS coupling (also known as Russell–Saunders coupling) in which the all-electron total quantum numbers for orbital (L),  spin (S) and total (J) angular momenta are good quantum numbers.

In the terminology of atomic spectroscopy, L and S together specify a term; L, S, and J specify a level;  and L, S, J and the magnetic quantum number MJ specify a state. The conventional term symbol has the form 2S+1LJ, where J is written optionally in order to specify a level. L is written using spectroscopic notation: for example, it is written "S", "P", "D", or "F" to represent L = 0, 1, 2, or 3 respectively. For coupling schemes other that LS coupling, such as the jj coupling that applies to some heavy elements, other notations are used to specify the term.

Term symbols apply to both neutral and charged atoms, and to their ground and excited states. Term symbols usually specify the total for all electrons in an atom, but are sometimes used to describe electrons in a given subshell or set of subshells, for example to describe each open subshell in an atom having more than one. The ground state term symbol for neutral atoms is described, in most cases, by Hund's rules. Neutral atoms of the chemical elements have the same term symbol for each column in the s-block and p-block elements, but differ in d-block and f-block elements where the ground-state electron configuration changes within a column, where exceptions to Hund's rules occur. Ground state term symbols for the chemical elements are given below.

The use of the word term for an atom's electronic state is based on the Rydberg–Ritz combination principle, an empirical observation that the wavenumbers of spectral lines can be expressed as the difference of two terms. This was later summarized by the Bohr model, which identified the terms with quantized energy levels, and the spectral wavenumbers of these levels with photon energies.

Tables of atomic energy levels identified by their term symbols are available for atoms and ions in ground and excited states from the National Institute of Standards and Technology (NIST).

Term symbols with LS coupling
The usual atomic term symbols assume LS coupling (also known as Russell–Saunders coupling), in which the atom's total spin quantum number S and the total orbital angular momentum quantum number L are "good quantum numbers". (Russell–Saunders coupling  is named after Henry Norris Russell and Frederick Albert Saunders, who described it in 1925). The spin-orbit interaction then couples the total spin and orbital moments to give the total electronic angular momentum quantum number J. Atomic states are then well described by term symbols of the form:

where
S is the total spin quantum number for the atom's electrons. The value 2S + 1 written in the term symbol is the spin multiplicity, which is the number of possible values of the spin magnetic quantum number MS for a given spin S.
J is the total angular momentum quantum number for the atom's electrons. J has a value in the range from |L − S| to L + S.
L is the total orbital quantum number in spectroscopic notation, in which the symbols for L are:

The orbital symbols S, P, D and F are derived from the characteristics of the spectroscopic lines corresponding to s, p, d, and f orbitals: sharp, principal, diffuse, and fundamental; the rest are named in alphabetical order from G onwards (omitting J, S and P). When used to describe electronic states of an atom, the term symbol is often written following the electron configuration. For example, 1s22s22p2 3P0 represents the ground state of a neutral carbon atom. The superscript 3 indicates that the spin multiplicity 2S + 1 is 3 (it is a triplet state), so S = 1; the letter "P" is spectroscopic notation for L = 1; and the subscript 0 is the value of J (in this case J = L − S).

Small letters refer to individual orbitals or one-electron quantum numbers, whereas capital letters refer to many-electron states or their quantum numbers.

Terms, levels, and states

The term symbol is also used to describe compound systems such as mesons or atomic nuclei, or molecules (see molecular term symbol). For molecules, Greek letters are used to designate the component of orbital angular momenta along the molecular axis.

For a given electron configuration 

Obviously, the dimension of function space in both representations must be the same.

In this case, J can be 1, 2, or 3, so 3 + 5 + 7 = 15.

Term symbol parity
The parity of a term symbol is calculated as 

where  is the orbital quantum number for each electron.  means even parity while  is for odd parity. In fact, only electrons in odd orbitals (with  odd) contribute to the total parity: an odd number of electrons in odd orbitals (those with an odd  such as in p, f,...) correspond to an odd term symbol, while an even number of electrons in odd orbitals correspond to an even term symbol. The number of electrons in even orbitals is irrelevant as any sum of even numbers is even. The summation of quantum numbers  over open (unfilled) subshells of odd orbitals ( odd) determines the parity of the term symbol. If the number of electrons in this reduced summation is odd (even) then the parity is also odd (even).

When it is odd, the parity of the term symbol is indicated by a superscript letter "o", otherwise it is omitted: 

Alternatively, parity may be indicated with a subscript letter "g" or "u", standing for gerade (German for "even") or ungerade ("odd"):

Ground state term symbol
It is relatively easy to calculate the term symbol for the ground state of an atom using Hund's rules. It corresponds with a state with maximum S and L. 
Start with the most stable electron configuration. Full shells and subshells do not contribute to the overall angular momentum, so they are discarded.
If all shells and subshells are full then the term symbol is 1S0.
Distribute the electrons in the available orbitals, following the Pauli exclusion principle. First, fill the orbitals with highest  value with one electron each, and assign a maximal ms to them (i.e. +). Once all orbitals in a subshell have one electron, add a second one (following the same order), assigning  to them.
The overall S is calculated by adding the ms values for each electron. According to Hund's first rule, the ground state has all unpaired electron spins parallel with the same value of ms, conventionally chosen as +. The overall S is then  times the number of unpaired electrons. The overall L is calculated by adding the  values for each electron (so if there are two electrons in the same orbital, add twice that orbital's ).
Calculate J as
if less than half of the subshell is occupied, take the minimum value ;
if more than half-filled, take the maximum value ;
if the subshell is half-filled, then L will be 0, so  .

As an example, in the case of fluorine, the electronic configuration is 1s22s22p5.
 Discard the full subshells and keep the 2p5 part. So there are five electrons to place in subshell p.
The first three electrons can take  but the Pauli exclusion principle forces the next two to have  because they go to already occupied orbitals.
 As fluorine 2p subshell is more than half filled, . Its ground state term symbol is then .

Atomic term symbols of the chemical elements 
In the periodic table, because atoms of elements in a column usually have the same outer electron structure, and always have the same electron structure in the "s-block" and "p-block" elements (see block (periodic table)), all elements may share the same ground state term symbol for the column. Thus, hydrogen and the alkali metals are all 2S, the alkali earth metals are  1S0, the boron column elements are 2P, the carbon column elements are 3P0, the pnictogens are 4S, the chalcogens are 3P2, the halogens are 2P, and the inert gases are 1S0, per the rule for full shells and subshells stated above.

Term symbols for the ground states of most chemical elements are given in the collapsed table below. In the d-block and f-block, the term symbols are not always the same for elements in the same column of the periodic table, because open shells of several d or f electrons have several closely spaced terms whose energy ordering is often perturbed by the addition of an extra complete shell to form the next element in the column.

For example, the table shows that the first pair of vertically adjacent atoms with different ground-state term symbols are V and Nb. The 6D ground state of Nb corresponds to an excited state of V 2112 cm−1 above the 4F ground state of V, which in turn corresponds to an excited state of Nb 1143 cm−1 above the Nb ground state. These energy differences are small compared to the 15158 cm−1 difference between the ground and first excited state of Ca, which is the last element before V with no d electrons.

Term symbols for an electron configuration
The process to calculate all possible term symbols for a given electron configuration is somewhat longer.
 First, the total number of possible microstates  is calculated for a given electron configuration. As before, the filled (sub)shells are discarded, and only the partially filled ones are kept. For a given orbital quantum number ,  is the maximum allowed number of electrons, . If there are  electrons in a given subshell, the number of possible microstates is

As an example, consider the carbon electron structure: 1s22s22p2. After removing full subshells, there are 2 electrons in a p-level, so there are

different microstates.
 Second, all possible microstates are drawn.
 Third, the number of microstates for each (ML,MS) possible combination is counted:
 Fourth, smaller tables can be extracted representing each possible term. Each table will have the size (2L+1) by (2S+1), and will contain only "1"s as entries. The first table extracted corresponds to ML ranging from −2 to +2 (so ), with a single value for MS (implying ). This corresponds to a 1D term. The remaining terms fit inside the middle 3×3 portion of the table above. Then a second table can be extracted, removing the entries for ML and MS both ranging from −1 to +1 (and so , a 3P term).
 Fifth, applying Hund's rules, the ground state can be identified (or the lowest state for the configuration of interest). Hund's rules should not be used to predict the order of states other than the lowest for a given configuration.

 If only two equivalent electrons are involved, there is an "Even Rule" which states that, for two equivalent electrons, the only states that are allowed are those for which the sum (L + S) is even.

Case of three equivalent electrons

Alternative method using group theory
For configurations with at most two electrons (or holes) per subshell, an alternative and much quicker method of arriving at the same result can be obtained from group theory. The configuration 2p2 has the symmetry of the following direct product in the full rotation group:

The square brackets enclose the anti-symmetric square. Hence the 2p2 configuration has components with the following symmetries:

The Pauli principle and the requirement for electrons to be described by anti-symmetric wavefunctions imply that only the following combinations of spatial and spin symmetry are allowed:

Then one can move to step five in the procedure above, applying Hund's rules.

The group theory method can be carried out for other such configurations, like 3d2, using the general formula

The symmetric square will give rise to singlets (such as 1S, 1D, & 1G), while the anti-symmetric square gives rise to triplets (such as 3P & 3F).

More generally, one can use

where, since the product is not a square, it is not split into symmetric and anti-symmetric parts. Where two electrons come from inequivalent orbitals, both a singlet and a triplet are allowed in each case.

Summary of various coupling schemes and corresponding term symbols 
Basic concepts for all coupling schemes: 
 : individual orbital angular momentum vector for an electron, : individual spin vector for an electron, : individual total angular momentum vector for an electron,  .
 : Total orbital angular momentum vector for all electrons in an atom. 
 : total spin vector for all electrons. 
 : total angular momentum vector for all electrons. The way the angular momenta are combined to form  depends on the coupling scheme:  for LS coupling,  for jj coupling, etc.
 The parameter called multiplicity represents the number of possible values of the total angular momentum quantum number J for certain conditions.
 For a single electron, the term symbol is not written as S is always 1/2, and L is obvious from the orbital type.
This example is for LS coupling and which vectors are summed in a coupling is depending on which scheme of coupling is taken. Of course, the angular momentum addition rule is that  where X can be s, ℓ, j, S, L, J or any other angular momentum-magnitude-related quantum number.

LS coupling (Russell–Saunders coupling)
From a practical point of view, it means L, S and J are obtained by using an addition rule of the angular momenta of given electron groups that are to be coupled.
 Electronic configuration + Term symbol: .  is a term which is from coupling of electrons in group.  are principle quantum number, orbital quantum number and means there are N (equivalent) electrons in  subshell. For ,  is equal to multiplicity, a number of possible values in J (final total angular momentum quantum number) from given S and L. For , multiplicity is  but  is still written in the term symbol. Sometimes right superscript o is attached to the term symbol, meaning the parity  of the group is odd.
 Example:
 3d7 4F7/2: 4F7/2 is level of 3d7 group in which are equivalent 7 electrons are in 3d subshell.
 3d7(4F)4s4p(3P0) 6F: Terms are assigned for each group (with different principal quantum number n) and rightmost level 6F is from coupling of terms of these groups so 6F represents final total spin quantum number S, total orbital angular momentum quantum number L and total angular momentum quantum number J in this atomic energy level. The symbols 4F and 3Po refer to seven and two electrons respectively so capital letters are used.
 4f7(8S0)5d (7Do)6p 8F13/2: There is a space between 5d and (7Do). It means (8S0) and 5d are coupled to get (7Do). Final level 8F is from coupling of (7Do) and 6p.
 4f(2F0) 5d2(1G) 6s(2G) 1P: There is only one term 2Fo which is isolated in the left of the leftmost space. It means (2Fo) is coupled lastly; (1G) and 6s are coupled to get (2G) then (2G) and (2Fo) are coupled to get final term 1P.

jj Coupling
 Coupling scheme: .
 Electronic configuration + Term symbol: 
 Example:
 : There are two groups.

J1L2 coupling
 Electronic configuration + Term symbol: . For  is equal to multiplicity, a number of possible values in J (final total angular momentum quantum number) from given S2 and K. For , multiplicity is  but  is still written in the term symbol.
 Example:
 3p5(2P)5g 2[9/2]: .  is K, which comes from coupling of J1 and ℓ2. Subscript 5 in term symbol is J which is from coupling of K and s2.
 4f13(2F)5d2(1D) [7/2]: .  is K, which comes from coupling of J1 and L2. Subscript  in the term symbol is J which is from coupling of K and S2.

LS1 coupling
 Coupling scheme:, .
 Electronic configuration + Term symbol: . For  is equal to multiplicity, a number of possible values in J (final total angular momentum quantum number) from given S2 and K. For , multiplicity is  but  is still written in the term symbol.
 Example:
 3d7(4P)4s4p(3Po) Do 3[5/2]: . .
Most famous coupling schemes are introduced here but these schemes can be mixed to express the energy state of an atom.

Racah notation and Paschen notation 
These are notations for describing states of singly excited atoms, especially noble gas atoms. Racah notation is basically a combination of LS or Russell–Saunders coupling and J1L2 coupling. LS coupling is for a parent ion and J1L2 coupling is for a coupling of the parent ion and the excited electron. The parent ion is an unexcited part of the atom. For example, in Ar atom excited from a ground state ...3p6 to an excited state ...3p54p in electronic configuration, 3p5 is for the parent ion while 4p is for the excited electron.

For an inert (noble) gas atom, usual excited states are  where N = 2, 3, 4, 5, 6 for Ne, Ar, Kr, Xe, Rn, respectively in order.

Paschen notation is a somewhat odd notation; it is an old notation made to attempt to fit an emission spectrum of neon to a hydrogen-like theory. It has a rather simple structure to indicate energy levels of an excited atom. An example of Paschen notation is below.

See also
 Quantum number
 Principal quantum number
 Azimuthal quantum number
 Spin quantum number
 Magnetic quantum number
 Angular quantum numbers
 Angular momentum coupling
 Molecular term symbol
 Hole formalism

Notes

References 

Atomic physics
Theoretical chemistry
Quantum chemistry